Cheyyur (Tamil: செய்யூர்), is a town in Tamil Nadu.

Cheyyur may also refer to:
 Cheyyur taluk, is a taluk.
 Cheyyur (state assembly constituency), is a state assembly constituency.
 Cheyyur Chengalvaraya Sastri, was a carnatic music composer .